Heil Environmental Industries, a subsidiary of Dover Corporation, is a manufacturer of garbage and recycling trucks. For many decades, Heil Environmental has been the chief supplier of refuse and recycling equipment for the New York City Sanitation Department., which is the world's largest waste collection agency The company has many smaller municipal customers, national publicly traded customers, and regional/small haulers as well.  Heil has an extensive US dealer network and also sells & supports its products in many countries around the world.

History
The company, originally named the Heil Rail Joint Welding Co., was founded in 1901 by Julius P. Heil in Milwaukee, Wisconsin.  The early company specialized in using the then-new technology of electrical welding to manufacture street car rails, tanks, and truck bodies.

Heil is currently based in Chattanooga, Tennessee, with its flagship manufacturing facility located in Fort Payne, Alabama.

The original Heil manufacturing complex at 3031 W. Montana St. in Milwaukee has been renovated and is primarily used as the Corporate Campus of Aurora Health Care, Inc.

References

External links
 Heil Environmental corporate website
 Dover Corporation

Truck manufacturers of the United States
Companies based in Tennessee
Vehicle manufacturing companies established in 1901
1901 establishments in Wisconsin